Nicolas Collin (born 1998) is a Belgian sport climber. He participated at the 2020 IFSC Climbing European Championships, being awarded the silver medal in the lead event. At the 2022 World Games, he won the gold medal in the boulder event.

See also
List of grade milestones in rock climbing
History of rock climbing
Rankings of most career IFSC gold medals

References

External links 

1998 births
Living people
Place of birth missing (living people)
Belgian rock climbers
21st-century Belgian people
World Games gold medalists
Competitors at the 2022 World Games
20th-century Belgian people